Huda Salih Mahdi Ammash is an Iraqi scientist and academic, often demonized as "Mrs. Anthrax" by Anglo-American media for her unproven association with the discontinued Iraqi biological weapons program as a part of the propaganda campaign to justify the Iraq War. Ammash was number 53 on the Pentagon's list of the 55 most wanted, the five of hearts in the deck of most wanted Iraqi playing cards, and the only woman to be featured. She was captured by coalition forces but later released without being charged.

Life

She received her undergraduate degree from the University of Baghdad, followed by a Masters in microbiology from Texas Woman's University in Denton, Texas. She spent four years at the University of Missouri in pursuit of her doctorate in microbiology, which she received in December 1983. Her thesis focused on the effects of radiation, paraquat and the chemotherapy drug Adriamycin, on bacteria and mammals.

She was appointed to the Revolutionary Command Council in May 2001. In one of several videos that Saddam released during the war, Ammash was the only woman among about a half-dozen men seated around a table. The videos were broadcast on Iraqi TV as invading forces drew closer to Baghdad: it is not known when the meeting took place or what the significance was of her appearance on camera.

Ammash served as president of Iraq's microbiology society and as dean at the University of Baghdad. U.S. officials said she was trained by Nassir al-Hindawi, described by United Nations inspectors as the "father of Iraq's biological weapons program".

She conducted research into illnesses that may have been caused by depleted uranium from shells used in the 1991 Gulf War,
and had published several papers on the health effects of the war and the subsequent sanctions. She was also said to be suffering from breast cancer.

Capture
Ammash surrendered to coalition forces on May 9, 2003 and was one of two Iraqi women known to be in U.S. custody as of April 2005. The other was the British-educated Dr. Rihab Taha, who led Iraq's biological weapons program until 1995.

In August 2005 the American Association for the Advancement of Science called for Ammash to be either sent to trial or released:

According to Times Higher Education, "The organisation [AAAS] has not issued the statement lightly. Senior figures including Alan Leshner, chief executive officer of the AAAS, were involved in drawing it up."

Both women were released in December 2005 after they were among those an American-Iraqi board process found were no longer a security threat and would have no charges filed against them.

Family
Ammash's father, Salih Mahdi Ammash, was a high-level Baath Party member in Iraq, who became defense minister in 1963, deputy prime minister in 1968, and an ambassador in 1977.

References

1953 births
Living people
Texas Woman's University alumni
University of Missouri alumni
People from Baghdad
Iraqi biological weapons program
Iraqi microbiologists
Iraqi women scientists
University of Baghdad alumni
Women in the Iraq War
Members of the Regional Command of the Arab Socialist Ba'ath Party – Iraq Region
Academic staff of the University of Baghdad
Women microbiologists
Prisoners and detainees of the United States military
People related to biological warfare
Most-wanted Iraqi playing cards
Iraq War prisoners of war
Iraqi prisoners of war